Sudarshan Parbat is a mountain of the Garhwal Himalaya in Uttarakhand India.The elevation of Sudarshan Parbat is  and its prominence is . It is joint 87th highest located entirely within the Uttrakhand. Nanda Devi, is the highest mountain in this category. Sudarshan Parbat lies 2.1 km south of Chaturbhuj  and 3.3 km west of Shyamvarn . Its nearest higher neighbor Chaturbhuj. It is located 3.7 km SW of Yogeshwar  and 9.9 km SW lies Manda I .

Climbing history
An Indo French expedition of eleven member, four French and seven Indian climbers led by Harish Kapadia attempt Sudarshan and six other peaks surrounding the Swetvarn Bamak. There are some previous claims of first summit of Sudarshan, later found false.  
On 30 May 1981 First ascent by the east ridge. The Summiters are Hubert Odier, Alain de Blanchaud, Zerksis Boga, Lakhpa Tsering, Bernard Odier and Jacques Giraud. They fixed some 1500 ft of rope on some difficult sections of ice. From the final camp they took six hours to reach the summit.

Glaciers and rivers

Swetvarn Bamak on the Eastern side. Thelu bamak on the Southern side both these Glaciers are tributaries of Raktvarn Bamak which drain itself at Gangotri Glacier. from there emerges Bhagirathi river. one of the main tributaries of river Ganga.

Neighboring peaks

Neighboring peaks of Sudarshan Parbat:

 Chaturbhuj  
 Matri 
 Swetvarn 
 Kalidhang 
 Yogeshwar 
 Thelu

See also

 List of Himalayan peaks of Uttarakhand

References

Mountains of Uttarakhand
Six-thousanders of the Himalayas
Geography of Chamoli district